An adept is an individual identified as having attained a specific level of knowledge, skill, or aptitude in doctrines relevant to a particular author or organization.

He or she stands out from others with their great abilities. All human qualities are developed in them, including intelligence and spirituality. Anyone can become an adept through spiritual development and self-improvement.

Etymology
The word "adept" is derived from Latin adeptus 'one who has attained' (the secret of transmuting metals).

Authors

H. P. Blavatsky
Madame Blavatsky makes liberal use of the term adept in her works to refer to their additional function as caretaker of ancient occult knowledge. She also mentions their great compassionate desire to help humanity and also documents other powers of the adept such as being able to take active control of elemental spirits as well as the physical and astral conditions of non-adepts.

Alice Bailey
In Alice Bailey's body of writing she outlines a hierarchy of spiritual evolution and an initiatory path along which an individual may choose to advance. In her works an Adept is defined as a being who has taken five of the seven initiations.

Orders
Various occult organizations have steps in which an initiate may ascend in their own magical system. Some call these steps degrees or grades.

Hermetic Order of the Golden Dawn
In the initiatory system of the Hermetic Order of the Golden Dawn, an adept is one who has taken the oath of the 5=6 grade and has been granted the title Adeptus Minor. Symbolically this degree represents a spiritual aspirant who, having mastered the union of the four elements under an upright and balanced spirit, is allowed passage from the Portal of the Vault of the Adepti into the tomb of Christian Rosenkreutz in the center of the Rosicrucian Mountain of Initiation, Abiegnus, at the center of the universe. The grade of Adeptus Minor and subsequent grades, Adeptus Major, and Adeptus Exemptus form the Second Order of the Golden Dawn, also called the Rosæ Rubeæ et Aureæ Crucis (The Ruby Rose and Golden Cross). These grades correspond to the kabbalistic sephirah of Tiphereth, Geburah, and Chesed respectively.

The oath of the Adeptus Minor includes a provision to "unite myself with my higher and Divine Genius", a process which is sometimes equated with "Knowledge and Conversation of the Holy Guardian Angel." To undertake this process the Adeptus Minor must reconfirm the work of earlier grades (Zelator through Philosophus) with their newfound knowledge before passing to the Adeptus Major degree, as a full-fledged adept.

A∴A∴
Aleister Crowley, who formed the A∴A∴, restructured the Golden Dawn system. This system still holds to three forms of adept.

Student
Probationer—The Order of the Golden Dawn--
Neophyte
Zelator
Practicus
Philosophus
Dominus Liminis—The order of the RC (Rose Cross)--
Adeptus Minor
Adeptus Major
Adeptus Exemptus
Babe of the Abyss—The Order of the S. S. (Silver Star)--
Magister Templi
Magus
Ipsissimus

Temple of Set
The Temple of Set calls their steps degrees, and places adept second. Its system is as follows:

Setian ( First Degree )
Adept ( Second Degree )
Priest / Priestess ( Third Degree )
Magister / Magistra Templi ( Fourth Degree )
Magus / Maga ( Fifth Degree )
Ipsissimus / Ipsissima ( Sixth Degree )

Illuminates of Thanateros
Also distinguished as degrees, the Illuminates of Thanateros, is a newer style of magic called chaos magic, which places adept closer to the top of their system.

4° Neophyte
3° Initiate
2° Adept
1° Magus

Ceremonial magic and theurgic practices
Those who practice esoteric arts such as theurgy and Kabbalah are familiar with the word 'adept.' In the traditions of esoteric Christianity and ceremonial magic, an adept is one who is skilled or profound, but not a master in these arts.

See also
 Apprentice Adept, a series of fantasy/science fiction novels by Piers Anthony
 Initiation
 Mystery cult
 Rosicrucianism
 Siddha
 Western esotericism

Notes

References
 Bailey, Alice A.: Initiation Human and Solar. New York: Lucis Publishing Company, 1997. 
 Blavatsky, H. P.: Isis Unveiled. Theosophical University Press, 1998. 
 Eshelman, James A.: The Mystical & Magical System of the A∴A∴. Los Angeles: College of Thelema, 2000. 
 Leadbeater, Charles W.: The Inner Life. The Theosophical Publishing House, 1978. 
 Regardie, Israel: The Complete Golden Dawn System of Magic. Scottsdale, AZ, USA: Falcon Press, 1984. 

Magic (supernatural)